The 1977 Open Championship was the 106th Open Championship, held 6–9 July on the Ailsa Course at Turnberry, Scotland. Tom Watson won the second of his five Open titles by one stroke over runner-up Jack Nicklaus. The two played together in the final two rounds and had separated themselves from the field under clear skies, leading this Open to be remembered as the "Duel in the Sun." This was the first Open ever held at Turnberry, which renamed its 18th hole after the duel. Three months earlier, Watson had held off Nicklaus to win his first green jacket at the Masters.

In the second round, Mark Hayes rebounded from his opening 76 (+6) with 63 to establish a new single round record at The Open Championship by two strokes. The previous record of 65 was set by Henry Cotton in the second round in 1934 at Royal St. George's and later equaled by nine others.  Lightning briefly interrupted play in the third round on Friday.

Americans dominated the final leaderboard, filling the top eight spots and eleven of the first twelve. The first page of the leaderboard was loaded with future members of the World Golf Hall of Fame.

The leader after 36 holes, Roger Maltbie, finished with 80 for 289 (+9), in a tie for 26th place.

The previous year, Watson was defending champion, but missed the 54-hole cut after an 80 in the third round, while Nicklaus finished in a tie for second.

Duel in the Sun
Watson's victory is considered by many to be the finest tournament played in the latter half of the 20th century.   After two rounds, he and Nicklaus were one shot out of the lead, in a four-way tie for second, and were paired for the third round on Friday. Both shot five-under 65 for 203 (−7), three shots clear of Ben Crenshaw and six ahead of the remainder of the field after 54 holes.

Paired again for the final round on Saturday afternoon, Nicklaus birdied twice and was up by three strokes after four holes. Watson birdied three of the next four to pull even at two-under for the round, then bogeyed the ninth hole to fall one back at the turn. Nicklaus birdied the 12th hole to go two strokes ahead, then Watson birdied 13 and the par-3 15th, rolling in a putt from off the green to even up the round at three-under.

Watson missed an eagle putt and tapped in for birdie, but then Nicklaus two-putted for par to go a stroke down with one hole remaining. On the 18th tee, Watson drove to an ideal position in the fairway, but Nicklaus went right and into the rough. Watson's 7-iron approach stopped pin-high and two feet left of the flag, and with Nicklaus in trouble, appeared to seal the victory. But Nicklaus slashed his 8-iron recovery onto the front of the green and sank his  putt for a remarkable birdie and a bogey-free 66. Now needing a seventh birdie of the round to avoid an 18-hole playoff, Watson sank the two-footer for his second straight 65, second Open, and third major title. With birdies on four of the final six holes, his total of 268 was eight strokes better than the previous best score ever in the Open.

Watson and Nicklaus finished well ahead of the other challengers, and shot the same score every day, except on Saturday. The third place finisher, reigning U.S. Open champion Hubert Green, shot a final round 67 and was a distant ten strokes behind Nicklaus, who won his third Open (and third career grand slam) the following year at St. Andrews.

Course

Ailsa Course

^ The 18th hole was renamed "Duel in the Sun" in 2003.

Past champions in the field

Made both cuts

Source:

Missed the first cut

Source:

Round summaries

First round
Wednesday, 6 July 1977

Source:

Second round
Thursday, 7 July 1977

Source:
Amateurs: Garner (+13), McEvoy (+13), Powell (+13), Carrick (+15), Lyle (+15), Pierse (+16), Wilson (+16), Cosh (+21), Chapman (+25).

Third round
Friday, 8 July 1977

Source:

Final round
Saturday, 9 July 1977

Source:

Scorecard
Final round

Cumulative tournament scores, relative to par
{|class="wikitable" span = 50 style="font-size:85%;
|-
|style="background: Pink;" width=10|
|Birdie
|style="background: PaleGreen;" width=10|
|Bogey
|}
Source:

References

External links
Turnberry 1977 (Official site)
106th Open Championship - Turnberry (European Tour)

The Open Championship
Golf tournaments in Scotland
Open Championship
Open Championship
Open Championship